Dickason may refer to:

Harry Dickason (gymnast) (1890–1962), British Olympic gymnast
Harry Dickason (seaman) (1884–1943), English seaman
Henry Lake Dickason (1886–1957), the president of Bluefield State College in West Virginia
Olive Dickason CM (1920–2011), Métis Canadian historian and journalist

See also
Mount Dickason in the Deep Freeze Range between Priestley and Campbell glaciers in Victoria Land, Antarctica
South Dickason Boulevard Residential Historic District, in Columbus, Wisconsin
Dickson (disambiguation)
Dikson (disambiguation)